RapidBus may refer to:

 RapidBus (TransLink), an express bus network in Metro Vancouver, British Columbia, Canada
 97X Kelowna RapidBus, a bus rapid transit line in Central Okanagan, British Columbia, Canada
 Rapibus, a bus rapid transit system in Gatineau, Quebec, Canada
 Rapid Bus, a bus transit operator in Kuala Lumpur, Malaysia

See also
 Bus rapid transit